The 2001 Copa Libertadores Final was a two-legged football match-up to determine the 2001 Copa Libertadores champion. It was contested by Argentine club Boca Juniors and Mexican club Cruz Azul. The first leg of the tie was played on 20 June at Estadio Azteca in Mexico City while the second leg was held in Boca Juniors' venue, La Bombonera, on 28 June.

The competition was won by defending champions Boca Juniors, who beat Cruz Azul 3–1 on penalties after a 1–1 draw on aggregate. It became Boca Juniors' fourth Copa Libertadores title.

Qualified teams

Venues

Route to the finals

Final summary

First leg

|

|}

Second leg

|

|}

References

l
l
2001
l
l
Football in Buenos Aires
l